This is a list of Italian television related events of 1975.

Shows of the year

Miniseries 

 Orlando furioso – by Luca Ronconi, from Ludovico Ariosto’s poem and Edoardo Sanguineti’s play, with Massimo Foschi (Roland), Ottavia Piccolo (Angelica), Luigi Diberti (Ruggiero), Edmonda Aldini (Bradamante), Michele Placido and Mariangela Melato, photography by Vittorio Storaro; 5 episodes. The serial, shot in Villa Farnese, does not repeat the success of the theatre version, set up by the same Ronconi. It is judged too experimental and intellectual by most of the public and the critics.
Il lungo viaggio (The long travel) – by Franco Giraldi, from the Fjodor Dostoevsky’s “ministerial novels” (The double, Notes from underground, A nasty story), with Flavio Bucci, Ottavia Piccolo and Glauco Mauri; 4 episodes.
Giandomenico Fracchia, sogni proibiti di uno di noi (Giandomenico Fracchia, forbidden dreams of one of us) -  comedy by Antonello Falqui, with Paolo Villaggio and Ombretta Colli; 4 episodes. Villaggio plays one of his typical characters, a timid and cowardly clerk who seeks refuge in fantasy.

Paranormal 

 L’amaro caso della baronessa di Carini – (The sad story of the baroness of Carini) – by Daniele D’Anza, with Ugo Pagliai, Janet Agren, Adolfo Celi and Paolo Stoppa as the teller; 4 episodes. Inspired by the true story of Laura Lanza, transferred in the 1812 Sicily, the series takes up the topic of the metempsychosis (already treated by the same director in Il segno del comando).
 Ritratto di donna velata (Portrait of painted woman) – by Flavio Bollini, with Nino Castelnuovo and Daria Nicolodi; 5 episodes. Another story of mystery and metempsychosis, this time set in a Tuscany again haunted by the presence of the Etrurians.

Variety 

 Di nuovo tante scuse (Many apologies again) – by Romolo Siena, with Raimondo Vianello and Sandra Mondaini; the show repeats the formula of Tante scuse.
 Fatti e fattacci (Deeds and foul deeds) – by Antonello Falqui, with Gigi Proietti and Ornella Vanoni as two wandering actors, playing stories inspired by the Italian folklore and the crime news. Winner of the Rose d’or, it’s one of the few RAI variety socially minded.  
 Macario uno e due - by Vito Molinari, with Erminio Macario and Gloria Paul.
 Mia, incontro con Mia Martini (Mia, meeting Mia Martini) – by Antonello Falqui.
 Totanbot – musical variety by Romolo Siena, with Iva Zanicchi.

Deaths 

 2 November - Pier Paolo Pasolini, 53, writer and director. He was one of the severest censors of the Italian television, until requesting its shutdown, but also a constant guest in the RAI cultural programs.

References 

1975 in Italian television